Bennett Alfred King (born 19 December 1964 in Mossman, Queensland, Australia) is an Australian cricket coach and former professional rugby league footballer. He played first-grade for the Gold Coast-Tweed Giants in the 1988 NSWRL season.

King former coach of the West Indies national cricket team. Before taking over the West Indies coaching role from Gus Logie, Bennett King was the Queensland Bulls' first team coach. In the 1999–2000 Australian domestic season, Bennett King was appointed as head coach after the departure of John Buchanan to the Australian national cricket team. In his first season King led the Bulls to victory in the first-class cricket competition, the Pura Cup. He then led them to victory in that same competition for the following two years, until he was appointed as the head coach at the Australian Cricket Academy. It was from there that he went on to be appointed as the head coach of the West Indies cricket team.

References

External links
 

Australian cricket coaches
1964 births
Living people
Coaches of the West Indies cricket team
Australian rugby league players
Gold Coast Chargers players
Rugby league players from Queensland